Phasis is an Afrotropical genus of butterflies in the family Lycaenidae.

Species
Phasis braueri Dickson, 1968
Phasis clavum Murray, 1935
Phasis pringlei Dickson, 1977
Phasis thero (Linnaeus, 1764)

External links
 "Phasis Hübner, [1819]" at Markku Savela's Lepidoptera and Some Other Life Forms

 
Lycaenidae genera
Taxa named by Jacob Hübner